Yuhanna ibn Masawaih  (circa 777–857),, also written Ibn Masawaih, Masawaiyh, and in Latin Janus Damascenus, or Mesue, Masuya, Mesue Major, Msuya, and Mesuë the Elder was a Persian or Assyrian East Syriac Christian physician from the Academy of Gundishapur. According to The Canon of Medicine for Avicenna and 'Uyun al-Anba for the medieval Arabic historian Ibn Abi Usaybi'a, Masawaiyh's father was Assyrian and his mother was Slavic.

Life

Born in 777 CE as the son of a pharmacist and physician from Gundishapur, he came to Baghdad and studied under Jabril ibn Bukhtishu.

He became director of a hospital in Baghdad, and was personal physician to four caliphs. He composed medical treatises on a number of topics, including ophthalmology, fevers, leprosy, headache, melancholia, dietetics, the testing of physicians, and medical aphorisms. One of Masawaiyh's treatises concerns aromatics, entitled, On Simple Aromatic Substances.

It was reported that Ibn Masawayh regularly held an assembly of some sort, where he consulted with patients and discussed subjects with pupils. Ibn Masawayh apparently attracted considerable audiences, having acquired a reputation for repartee.

He was also the teacher of Hunain ibn Ishaq. He translated various Greek medical works into Syriac, but wrote his own work in Arabic. Apes were supplied to him by the caliph al-Mu'tasim for dissection.

Many anatomical and medical writings are credited to him, notably the "Disorder of the Eye" (Daghal al-'ain), which is the earliest Systematic treatise on ophthalmology extant in Arabic and the Aphorisms, the Latin translation of which was very popular in the Middle Ages.

He died in Samarra in 857 CE.

See also
Aegyptiacum
Ophthalmology in medieval Islam

Sources
For his life and writings, see:

 Liber primus, seu methodus medicamenta purgantia simplicia . Bernuz, Caesaraugustae 1550 Digital edition by the University and State Library Düsseldorf 
 De re medica  . Rouillius / Rolletius, Lugduni 1550 (translated by Jacques Dubois) Digital edition by the University and State Library Düsseldorf
 J.-C. Vadet, "Ibn Masawayh" in, The Encyclopaedia of Islam, 2nd edition, ed. by H.A.R. Gibbs, B. Lewis, Ch. Pellat, C. Bosworth et al., 11 vols. (Leiden: E.J. Brill, 1960-2002) vol. 3, pp. 872–873
Manfred Ullmann, Die Medizin im Islam, Handbuch der Orientalistik, Abteilung I, Ergänzungsband vi, Abschnitt 1 (Leiden: E.J. Brill, 1970), pp. 112–115
Fuat Sezgin, Medizin-Pharmazie-Zoologie-Tierheilkunde bis ca 430 H., Geschichte des arabischen Schrifttums, Band 3 (Leiden: E.J. Brill, 1970), pp. 231–236.

References

Greek–Syriac translators
770s births
857 deaths
9th-century Iranian physicians
Pharmacologists of medieval Iran
Medieval Assyrian physicians
Physicians from the Abbasid Caliphate
Translators of the medieval Islamic world
Members of the Assyrian Church of the East
Nestorians in the Abbasid Caliphate
Court physicians